Charles Theophile de Jaeger (27 February 1911 – 19 May 2000) was a cameraman for the BBC. He is best known as one of the creators of a famous April Fools' Day joke from 1957: a three-minute spoof report on the Swiss spaghetti harvest beside Lake Lugano broadcast by the British current affairs programme Panorama.

Early years
De Jaeger was born in Vienna. He worked for the Free French Film Unit during World War II and joined the BBC in July 1943, working as a sub-editor on news for Central Europe. He became a television cameraman in 1948. He was the first BBC newsreel cameraman to film outside the United Kingdom.

April Fools 1957
The idea for the April Fool came from his school days, during which a teacher had once said "Boys, you are so stupid, you'd believe me if I told you that spaghetti grew on trees". He developed the idea with producer David Wheeler and it was approved by the editor of Panorama, Michael Peacock. A silent film was recorded in Castagnola in Switzerland in March and a commentary written by Wheeler was added by respected broadcaster Richard Dimbleby.

Personal life
De Jaeger left the BBC in 1959 to become a freelancer. He died in London in May 2000.

References

External links
 Museum of Hoaxes article on the Swiss Spaghetti Harvest hoax
 
 Obituary, The Independent, 29 May 2000

1911 births
2000 deaths
Austrian emigrants to the United Kingdom